Ulrich III von Graben († 16 February 1486) was a member of the Austrian nobility and an important member of the court of emperor Frederick III of Austria. He was Lord of Kornberg, the Lordship Marburg, Obermarburg and Maribor Castle. Furthermore his served as an imperial Burggraf of Graz and Marburg (Maribor) and Landeshauptmann of Styria.

Biography
Ulrich's parents were Friedrich II von Graben and a Lady von Plankenwarth or Adelheid Hoffer. He was a descendant of the dynastic House of Graben von Stein, originating from the dynasty Meinhardiner. He was related to the Lords Philipp Breuner and Ruprecht I von Windischgraetz. His uncle was Lord Andreas von Graben zu Sommeregg, the founder of the Carinthian line of the family.

Ulrich von Graben married in 1464 Agnes Närringer, daughter of Mert Närringer and widow of Lord Hans Breuner. The couple had seven children.
 Wolfgang von Graben († 1521), styrian Lord and Burggraf, imperial military and administrator
 Andree von Graben († 1521), Lord of Kornberg and Graben, bailiff of Slovenj Gradec (Windischgraetz)
 Georg von Graben († 1522)
 Rosina von Graben († 1539), married Heinrich from the House of Guttenberg, princebishop-bambergs stadholder in carynthia
 Margret (Marusch) von Graben, married three times; Andree von Himmelberg, Christoph von Silberberg and with the bavarian Siegmund von Königsfeld(er), Lord of Niederaichbach (1500; † 1539). Note about Von Himmelberg: Hans von Himmelberg fought against the peasants in Salzburg in 1525 and died in 1550 after campaigning against the Turks. In the Lavanttal, the Himmelbergers owned Himmelau Castle, Neudau, the adjoining Schleinzhof and the Pauric House in Wolfsberg.
 Elisabeth von Graben, married Lord Georg IV von Auersperg
 Wilhelm von Graben († 1523), Lord of Kornberg and Graben, Lord of the manor Saldenhofen and imperial Burggraf of Burg Neuberg

Ulrich was first named in 1452 as member at the Coronation of the Holy Roman Emperor of Frederick III of Austria. In 1456 he elected, together with his father Friedrich, Lord of the Lordship Marburg. In the same year Ulrich was elected imperial Burggraf of Maribor. In 1462 he succeeded Lord Eberhard VIII von Walsee as Landeshauptmann (state captain) of the Duchy of Styria. In 1469 he was succeeded by Count Wilhelm von Dirnstein. In the same year Ulrich became imperial Seneschal and emperor Friedrich III pledged him with the castle of Maribor. In 1483 Ulrich was elected imperial Burggraf of Graz. As burggraf of Graz he was deeply involved in the war against Matthias Corvinus. In this time he was the emperors deputy.

Notes

People from Styria
Medieval Austrian nobility
Medieval Austrian knights
15th-century Austrian people